Baranda is a village and Gram panchayat in Bilhaur Tehsil, Kanpur Nagar district, Uttar Pradesh, India. It is located 71 km away from Kanpur City. Village code is 149898.

References

Villages in Kanpur Nagar district